Conus wilsi is a species of sea snail, a marine gastropod mollusk in the family Conidae, the cone snails and their allies.

Like all species within the genus Conus, these snails are predatory and venomous. They are capable of "stinging" humans, therefore they should be handled carefully or not at all.

Description
The size of the shell attains 30 mm.

Distribution
This species occurs in the Red Sea.

References

 Delsaerdt, A. 1998. Conus wilsi a new species from the Red Sea. Gloria Maris 36(4): 69–72, 4 figs.

External links
 The Conus Biodiversity website
 

wilsi
Gastropods described in 1998